Emily Slosberg is an American politician who sits in the Florida House of Representatives. She represents the Boca Raton area and is a member of the Florida Democratic Party. She ran in 2016 succeeding her father Irving Slosberg. She introduced a bill in 2018 to make it an offense to leave a young child in a car for more than 15 minutes.

References

Women state legislators in Florida
Living people
Year of birth missing (living people)
Democratic Party members of the Florida House of Representatives
21st-century American politicians
21st-century American women politicians